Meyras is a commune in the Ardèche department in southern France.

Geography
The river Lignon forms part of the commune's southeastern border, then joins the Ardèche, which flows east through the commune.

Population

See also
Communes of the Ardèche department

References

Communes of Ardèche
Ardèche communes articles needing translation from French Wikipedia
Vivarais